Fili Fort (Al Hisn Fili) is a late Islamic fortification located to the east of the town of Madam, in the United Arab Emirates' emirate of Sharjah.

There are in fact two forts at Hili, Fili West Fort and Fili East Fort. However, Fili East Fort is uniquely referred to as Fili Fort and is a later building dating to the C19th. Fili West Fort, located on a small hill in the Madam plain, was established around a watchtower, or Muraba'a, and is said locally to be 500 years old. The two forts are connected by a network of two underground waterways, or aflaj. Fili  Fort was at one stage used as a police station and a more modern, smooth-walled section attached to the square fortification (on the opposite corner to the two-story tower) attests to this later use.

The ruin of an old souq, a four-roomed flat-roofed structure, stands nearby Fili Fort. A number of Islamic era burials dot the plain around the fort. Finds of ceramics in the area date from Iron Age to C19th Chinese trade ware.

Fili Fort formed part of Sharjah's 2018 bid for UNESCO World Heritage Status, under the heading 'Sharjah, Gateway to the Trucial States', which also included the Heart of Sharjah; Sharjah Fort; the former barracks of the Trucial Oman Scouts in Mirgab; Al Mahatta Fort, the first airport in the Gulf; the coastal town of Khor Fakkan; the oasis and settlement of Wadi Helo, all following the theme of a return to the simplicity and natural lifestyles of the late 1950s.

References 

Forts in the United Arab Emirates
History of the United Arab Emirates by topic
History of the Emirate of Sharjah